The 2021–22 Liga III was the 66th season of Liga III, the third tier of the Romanian football league system. The season began in August 2021 and ended on 28 May 2022.

This season was the second consecutive with a format that included 100 teams (10x10). The format was changed before the previous season, due to the financial problems generated by the COVID-19 pandemic. The difference this season is that a play-off and play-out was introduced between the regular season and the promotion play-offs.



Team changes

To Liga III
Promoted from Liga IV
 Dinamo Bacău  (debut)
 Fetești   (after 7 years of absence)
 Real Bradu   (debut)
 Voința Lupac   (debut)
 Viitorul Șimian   (after 15 years of absence)
 Pobeda Stár Bišnov   (debut)
 Frontiera Curtici   (after 16 years of absence)
 Aurul Brad   (after 16 years of absence)

Relegated from Liga II
 Comuna Recea  (after 1 year of absence)
 CSM Reșița  (after 2 years of absence)
 Slatina  (after 1 year of absence)
 Pandurii Targu Jiu  (after 21 years of absence)
 Aerostar Bacău  (after 1 year of absence)

From Liga III
Relegated to Liga IV
 Bradu Borca  (ended 1-year stay)
 Balotești  (ended 2-year stay)
 Industria Galda  (ended 7-year stay)
 Fortuna Becicherecu Mic  (ended 2-year stay)
 Mostiștea Ulmu  (ended 2-year stay)
 Concordia II Chiajna  (ended 1-year stay)
 Astra II  (ended 7-year stay)
 Măgura Cisnădie  (ended 1-year stay)
 Gaz Metan II Mediaș  (ended 1-year stay)

Promoted to Liga II
 Dacia Unirea Brăila (ended 2-year stay)
 Steaua București (ended 1-year stay)
 Corona Brașov (ended 1-year stay)
 Viitorul Șelimbăr (ended 2-years stay)
 Unirea Dej  (ended 14-years stay)

Renamed teams
CSO Cugir was renamed as Metalurgistul Cugir.

CSC Sânmartin was renamed as Lotus Băile Felix.

1. FC Gloria was renamed as Gloria Bistrița-Năsăud.

Excluded teams
Astra II, Gaz Metan II Mediaș, Concordia II Chiajna, Mostiștea Ulmu, Măgura Cisnădie, Avântul Valea Mărului, Axiopolis Cernavodă and Comuna Recea withdrew from the championship during the summer break.

Spared from relegation
Făurei, Universitatea II Craiova, Hermannstadt II and Minerul Costești were spared from relegation on the vacant places left by the excluded teams.

Enrolled teams
Argeș II Pitești, CFR II Cluj and Viitorul II Târgu Jiu were enrolled in the Liga III as the second teams of Liga I clubs Argeș Pitești and CFR Cluj, respectively the second team of Liga II side Viitorul Târgu Jiu, also on the vacant places left by the excluded teams.

Viitorul Cluj was enrolled directly in the third tier due to good results obtained in the youth leagues organized by the Romanian Football Federation.

League map

Regular season

Seria I

Seria II

Seria III

Seria IV

Seria V

Seria VI

Seria VII

Seria VIII

Seria IX

Seria X

Play-off round

Seria I

Seria II

Seria III

Seria IV

Seria V

Seria VI

Seria VII

Seria VIII

Seria IX

Seria X

Play-out round

Seria I

Seria II

Seria III

Seria IV

Seria V

Seria VI

Seria VII

Seria VIII

Seria IX

Seria X

Promotion play-offs
The promotion play-offs are disputed between the first two teams from each of the ten play-off round series. Only the best five teams will be promoted to 2022–23 Liga II.

First round

Second round

Possible relegation
At the end of the season, a special table was made between 8th places from the 10 series. The last team in this table was also relegated in the Liga IV. In this table, 8th place teams are included without the points obtained against teams that relegated in their series.

References

2021
3
Romania